Donna Smith may refer to:

 Donna Smith (athlete) (1965–1999), Australian Paralympian
 Donna Smith (footballer) (born 1967), English former international women's football defender
 Donna Smith (model) (born 1960), American model and Playboy Playmate
 Donna Smith (politician), Iowa politician
 Donna Smith, Miss South Dakota USA